Pléven is a commune in the Côtes-d'Armor department of Brittany in northwestern France, 70km north west of Rennes.

The Arguenon river flows through the commune.

Notable buildings
The parish church is dedicated to St Pierre.

The Manoir du Vaumadeuc dates from the 15th century, and was built by Madeuc, lord of Guémadeuc. In the 18th century it was acquired by Joseph-Marie-François de Talhouèt, Comte de Sévérac. After the French Revolution, François Tresvaux du Fraval, a Priest Canon of Paris, had his library at the Manor. In the 20th century the Manor passed to the family of the Vicomte de Pontbriand.

There is a small museum dedicated to the history of wooden clog making (Musee due sabotier).

Population

Inhabitants of Pléven are called plévennais in French.

See also
Communes of the Côtes-d'Armor department

References

External links

Communes of Côtes-d'Armor